Stephen Astwood (born September 8, 1981) is a retired Bermudian football player.

Club career
Astwood began his career as a striker with PHC Zebras and the Somerset Trojans, and played for several years in the Bermudian Premier Division before joining the Bermuda Hogges in the USL Second Division for its inaugural season in 2007. He has been a starting midfielder throughout his three seasons with the team and was named the league's Rookie of the Year in 2007.

In summer 2012, Astwood joined Southampton Rangers from PHC Zebras.

International career
He made his debut for Bermuda in a January 2000 friendly match against Canada and earned a total of 26 caps, scoring 3 goals. He has represented his country in 9 FIFA World Cup qualification matches.

His final international match was an August 2008 CONCACAF Gold Cup qualification match against the Cayman Islands.

International goals
Scores and results list Bermuda's goal tally first.

References

External links

1981 births
Living people
Association football midfielders
Bermudian footballers
Bermuda international footballers
PHC Zebras players
Bermuda Hogges F.C. players
USL Second Division players